Eye to Eye is a business-themed television interview program hosted by Francine Lacqua, which airs in selected regions on Bloomberg Television. In each episode, Lacqua interviews prominent or senior business figures inside one of the passenger capsules of the London Eye Ferris wheel in London.

The program is similar to another Bloomberg Television series High Flyers, which conducts interviews on the Singapore Flyer.

Broadcast

The series premiered on 28 March 2011 on Bloomberg Television's Europe, the Middle East and Africa feeds. The series premiered in Asia Pacific markets on 11 June 2011.

Episodes

Season 1 (2011)

Season 2 (2011)

Awards

References

External links

English-language television shows
Bloomberg L.P.
Business-related television series in the United Kingdom